The Ellsworth American is a local weekly newspaper covering Hancock County, Maine.

Overview
The Ellsworth American is a locally owned and managed weekly newspaper serving Hancock County, Maine. Publication began Oct. 17, 1851, making The American the oldest newspaper in Hancock County and the second oldest in Maine. The newspaper has won numerous awards and distinctions from state, New England and national newspaper associations in recognition of news coverage, photography, editorial pages, advertising layouts and general excellence.

Circulation
The Americans 2012 circulation was 10,355.

Publication
The newspaper, which has a Thursday dateline, is printed each Wednesday afternoon and is available on newsstands throughout Hancock and western Washington counties and the Bangor/Brewer area of Penobscot County. Print subscriptions are mailed nationwide and fully searchable digital subscriptions have been available since 2009. The Americans website, ellsworthamerican.com, is updated daily.

Staff
The Ellsworth American and its sister paper The Mount Desert Islander in 2012 employed a combined staff of 55. Departments include news, advertising, internet, circulation, administration, accounting, creative services and the press and mail room. 

Publisher Alan Baker purchased the paper in 1991. In 2018, he sold the company to Reade Brower. The administrative staff includes General Manager Kathy Cook and Managing Editor Cyndi Wood.

History
The Ellsworth American began as The Ellsworth Herald on Oct. 17, 1851. It was founded by Bangor men Elijah Couillard and W.B. Hilton. The name was changed to Ellsworth American in 1855 and modified to The Ellsworth American in 1864. James Russell Wiggins, former editor of The Washington Post and briefly U.S. ambassador to the United Nations, spent more than 30 years as editor of the paper. Wiggins transformed the small-town weekly into an award-winning and nationally recognized publication. Upon retiring as ambassador, Wiggins took over operations in 1969. He was editor until his death in 2000. His poems still are published on The Americans editorial page. Wiggins also wrote a weekly column titled "The Fenceviewer" commemorating the title of officials elected in early New England towns to settle boundary disputes between neighbors. In January 1991, Wiggins sold the paper to current publisher Alan Baker, who joined The American staff in 1986.

The Americans sister paper, The Mount Desert Islander in Bar Harbor, was founded in 2001.

The Americans 160th anniversary in 2011 was commemorated at the state capitol.  The Senate passed a legislative sentiment honoring The American as a locally owned and managed paper and the second oldest weekly newspaper in Maine.  "With today’s trend of media consolidation, having a hometown newspaper like The Ellsworth American remain under local ownership and control is rare and wonderful," state Sen. Brian Langley (R-Hancock County) said at the time.

In 2018, Baker sold The American and Islander to Reade Brower.

References

External links
 

Newspapers published in Maine
Ellsworth, Maine
Mass media in Hancock County, Maine
1851 establishments in Maine
Publications established in 1851